Who Is the Craftiest is a 1988 Hong Kong comedy film directed by Poon Man-kit and starring Ricky Hui, Bill Tung, Tang Pik-wan, Sammy Cheung, Tiffany Lau, Keung Chung-ping and Lo Hoi-pang.

Cast
 Ricky Hui as Mon
 Bill Tung as Leung Piu
 Tang Pik-wan as Mrs. Kang / Mita Sudan
 Sammy Cheung as Kang Chuen
 Tiffany Lau as Siu Wan / Winnie
 Keung Chung-ping as Kang Chung Ping
 Lo Hoi-pang as Police sergeant Pang
 Fung King-man as Kang's family member
 Yu Mo-lin as Kang's family member
 Cheung Hei as Letter writer
 Leung Oi as Kang's family member
 Shirley Gwan as Susan
 Amy Yip as Club girl
 Yeung Yau-cheung as Kang's family member
 Ho Pak-kwong as Kang's family servant
 Mai Kei as Brother Wah
 Chan Kim-wang as Superintendent KK Wong
 Ben Wong Tin-tok
 Leung Hak-shun as Jewelry store's staff
 Ling Lai-man as Manager Wong of jewelry store
 Thomas Sin as Wedding car driver
 Yung Sau-yee
 Tony Tam as Cop
 Chin Lai-yee
 Luk Ying-hung as policeman
 Lam Foo-wai as Fake cop
 Ng Kwok-kin as policeman
 Ho Chi-moon as Passerby
 Kingson Shek as Cop

Box office
This film grossed HK$3,193,219 during its theatrical run from 1 January to 7 January 1988 in Hong Kong.

External links
 
 Who Is The Craftiest ? at Hong Kong Cinemagic
 

1988 films
1988 comedy films
Hong Kong comedy films
1980s Cantonese-language films
Films set in Hong Kong
Films shot in Hong Kong
Films directed by Poon Man-kit
1980s Hong Kong films